Çekiçler can refer to:

 Çekiçler, Aksaray
 Çekiçler, Çan